The Egyptian Paralympic Committee is the National Paralympic Committee in Egypt for the Paralympic Games movement. It is a non-profit organisation that selects teams, and raises funds to send Egyptian competitors to Paralympic events organised by the International Paralympic Committee (IPC).

See also
Egypt at the Paralympics

References

External links
Official website

National Paralympic Committees
Paralympic
Egypt at the Paralympics
Organisations based in Cairo